The Americas Zone was one of the three regional zones of the 1980 Davis Cup.

12 teams entered the Americas Zone in total, split across the North & Central America and the South America Zones. The winner of each sub-zone advanced to the Americas Inter-Zonal Final, with the winner going on to compete in the Inter-Zonal Zone against the winners of the Eastern Zone and Europe Zone.

The United States defeated Mexico in the North & Central America Zone final, and Argentina defeated Brazil in the South America Zone final. In the Americas Inter-Zonal Final Argentina defeated the United States and progressed to the Inter-Zonal Zone.

North & Central America Zone

Preliminary rounds

Draw

First round
Caribbean/West Indies vs. Canada

Qualifying Draw
Canada vs. Mexico

Venezuela vs. Colombia

Main draw

Draw

Semifinals
Mexico vs. Venezuela

Final
Mexico vs. United States

South America Zone

Preliminary rounds

Draw

First round
Peru vs. Uruguay

Qualifying round
Uruguay vs. Chile

Ecuador vs. Brazil

Main draw

Draw

Semifinals
Brazil vs. Chile

Final
Brazil vs. Argentina

Americas Inter-Zonal Final
Argentina vs. United States

References

External links
Davis Cup official website

Davis Cup Americas Zone
Americas
Davis Cup
Davis Cup
Davis Cup
Davis Cup